Elena Obono Nkuadum Oyana (born 13 November 1999) is an Equatorial Guinean footballer who plays as a forward for Huracanes FC and the Equatorial Guinea women's national team.

International career
Obono made her senior debut for Equatorial Guinea on 27 November 2017. She competed at the 2018 Africa Women Cup of Nations, playing in three matches and scoring one goal. She also represented the country at under-20 level at the 2015 African U-20 Women's World Cup Qualifying Tournament and 2019 African Games.

International goals
Scores and results list Equatorial Guinea's goal tally first

References

External links

1999 births
Living people
Equatoguinean women's footballers
Women's association football forwards
Equatorial Guinea women's international footballers
African Games competitors for Equatorial Guinea
Competitors at the 2019 African Games